Space Jam is a 1996 film starring Michael Jordan and the Looney Tunes characters.
Related releases include:
Space Jam (soundtrack), music from the 1996 film
Space Jam (pinball), a pinball game based on the 1996 film
Space Jam (video game), a 1996 video game for the Sega Saturn and Sony PlayStation
Teen Titans Go! See Space Jam, a 2021 crossover movie with Teen Titans Go!
Space Jam: A New Legacy, a 2021 sequel to the 1996 film, starring LeBron James

Space Jam may also refer to:
"Space Jam" (Yes, Dear episode), an episode of the television series Yes, Dear